Kingsmead is a cricket ground in Durban, South Africa. It has a capacity of 25,000 and at present operates under the sponsor name of "Sahara Stadium Kingsmead". Kingsmead has hosted 45 Test matches, the first was in 1923 when South Africa played the touring England team. The ground has also hosted 47 One Day Internationals (ODIs), the first was in 1992 when South Africa played India.

The Englishman Phil Mead became the first Test century scorer at the ground when he made 181 against South Africa in 1923. Of the 74 Test centuries made at the ground the highest is Gary Kirsten's innings of 275 made against England in 1999. The highest score by an overseas player is 243 which was achieved by the Englishman Eddie Paynter. The only other players to have scored a double century at Kingsmead are Graeme Pollock and Bill Edrich. Three players have scored a century in both innings of a match at the ground. The Englishman Jack Russell became the first player to do it in 1912 followed by the Australian's Ricky Ponting and Phillip Hughes in 2006 and 2009 respectively. Jacques Kallis holds the record for the most Test centuries at the ground with five.

In 1993, against Pakistan, the West Indian Brian Lara scored the first of twenty-three ODI centuries at the ground. Lara's innings of 128 from 125 deliveries remains the highest ODI score seen at Kingsmead. Four players – Jacques Kallis, David Miller, Faf du Plessis and Quinton de Kock (all of South Africa) – have scored two ODI centuries at the ground.

Key
 * denotes that the batsman was not out.
 Inns. denotes the number of the innings in the match.
 Balls denotes the number of balls faced in an innings.
 NR denotes that the number of balls was not recorded.
 Parentheses next to the player's score denotes his century number at Kingsmead.
 The column title Date refers to the date the match started.
 The column title Result refers to whether the player's team won, lost or if the match was drawn, tied, or a no result.

Test centuries

The following table summarises the Test centuries scored at Kingsmead.

One Day International centuries

The following table summarises the One Day International centuries scored at Kingsmead.

Twenty20 International century

The following table summarises the Twenty20 International century scored at Kingsmead.

Women's Test centuries
The following table summarises the women's Test centuries scored at Kingsmead.

References 

Kingsmead
Cricket grounds in South Africa
Centuries
Centuries